Waipa District is a municipality in the Waikato region of New Zealand that is administered by the Waipa District Council. Its most populous town is Cambridge. The seat of the council is at the second most populous town, Te Awamutu. The district is south and south-east of the city of Hamilton. It has five wards: Te Awamutu, Cambridge, Pirongia, Maungatautari and Kakepuku.

Although the official name remains Waipa District, the council sought in 2020 a simpler means of changing to Waipā District, which is the orthographic form it uses.

History
The District was formed from Waipa County Council and its town boroughs in 1989. The county boundaries had varied since five ridings were formed in Waipa county in 1876: Newcastle, Hamilton, Mangapiko North and South, Rangiaowhia, and Pukekura. In 1902 it covered  and had an additional riding, Tuhikaramea.

Geography
The Waikato River forms much of the eastern boundary of the district, before it flows north-westward through the district, past Cambridge. The Waipā River, the Waikato River's main tributary, flows northwards through the western part of the district; the two rivers meet outside the district. The highest mountains are Mount Pirongia in the west and Maungatautari in the east.

The region's economy is based largely on dairy farming and cereal production. The southeastern corner of the district includes the hydroelectric project at Karapiro.

Demographics

Waipa District had a population of 53,241 at the 2018 New Zealand census, an increase of 6,573 people (14.1%) since the 2013 census, and an increase of 10,740 people (25.3%) since the 2006 census. There were 19,518 households, comprising 26,067 males and 27,171 females, giving a sex ratio of 0.96 males per female. The median age was 40.5 years (compared with 37.4 years nationally), with 10,995 people (20.7%) aged under 15 years, 9,252 (17.4%) aged 15 to 29, 23,535 (44.2%) aged 30 to 64, and 9,456 (17.8%) aged 65 or older.

Ethnicities were 87.7% European/Pākehā, 14.9% Māori, 1.8% Pacific peoples, 4.3% Asian, and 1.9% other ethnicities. People may identify with more than one ethnicity.

The percentage of people born overseas was 18.5, compared with 27.1% nationally.

Although some people chose not to answer the census's question about religious affiliation, 51.6% had no religion, 36.9% were Christian, 0.8% had Māori religious beliefs, 0.6% were Hindu, 0.2% were Muslim, 0.5% were Buddhist and 1.9% had other religions.

Of those at least 15 years old, 8,175 (19.4%) people had a bachelor's or higher degree, and 8,130 (19.2%) people had no formal qualifications. The median income was $35,500, compared with $31,800 nationally. 8,256 people (19.5%) earned over $70,000 compared to 17.2% nationally. The employment status of those at least 15 was that 21,927 (51.9%) people were employed full-time, 6,345 (15.0%) were part-time, and 1,269 (3.0%) were unemployed.

References

External links

 Council website
 Council's District profile
 1935 Waipa County Council map